Olympic Day Run is an international Olympic Movement activity promoting mass participation of sports held in June organized by National Olympic Committees (NOCs).

The International Olympic Committee (IOC) was formally established on 23 June 1894 through the efforts of Pierre de Coubertin promoting competitive sport as a revival of the ancient Olympic Games.

Due to World War II, Olympic Games had not been held in either 1940 or 1944. The city of London rose to host to the Games of the XIV after World War II. In January 1948, the International Olympic Committee (IOC) approved the idea of Olympic Day to commemorate the creation of the IOC on 23 June 1894 in Paris, a sort of “ birthday ” of the Olympic Movement at the 42nd IOC Session in St Moritz, Switzerland. Olympic Day was held for the first time on 23 June with a total of 9 National Olympic Committees (NOCs) hosting ceremonies in their respective countries: Austria, Belgium, Canada, Great Britain, Greece, Portugal, Switzerland, Uruguay and Venezuela.

In 1987, in an effort to encourage all NOCs to commemorate and celebrate Olympic Day, the IOC Sport for All Commission launched the Olympic Day Run concept with the objective of promoting the practice of participation in sport by men, women and children from all corners of the world and all walks of life, regardless of athletic ability. The first Olympic Day Run was held in 1987, over a distance of 10 km, with 45 participating NOCs. In 2006, there were 161 NOCs promoting Olympic Day Run to their countrymen.

The Olympic Day Run is usually held during June 17–24 by NOCs, with 1.5 km Olympic Day Fun Run, 5 km, and 10 km running activities.

References

OLYMPIC DAY RUN
Get involved in Olympic Day!

Olympic Games
June events
10K runs
Recurring sporting events established in 1987